Gudang or Djagaraga (Pantyinamu/Yatay/Gudang/Kartalaiga and other clans) is an Australian Aboriginal language. It is the traditional language of the Gudang people, and is the northernmost language of the Cape York Peninsula.  It is closely related to Urradhi (dialects Urradhi, Angkamuthi, Yadhaykenu, Wudhadhi, etc.), its neighbour to the south, and distantly related to its neighbour to the north, the Western-Central Torres Strait Language (Kala Lagaw Ya), from which it borrowed quite a few vocabulary items.

Phonology

Going by the records of the language recorded in MacGillivray and Brierly, as well as comparing these with their Urradhi and WCL counterparts, the phonology of the language appeared to have been as follows:
	

Some Western-Central Torres Strait Language (WCL; see Kalau Lagau Ya) loans probably retained the WCL vowels unchanged. The vowels e/ ee  otherwise appear to have had a similar marginal status as in Urradhi (Crowley 1983:317).

consonants :

labial  p, b, m 

velar  k, g, ng 

labio-velar  kw, w 

lamino-dental  th, dh, l, nh 

lamino-palatal  ch, j, ny, y 

alveolar  t, d, n 

retroflex  rt, rr, r 

The non-sonorant sounds appear to have had voice contrasts, except after nasals, when both voiced and voiceless allophones occurred, with the voiced allophones seemingly more common.  While the lamino-dental and alveolar contrast was not marked by the European recorders, the Urradhi and WCL cognates strongly suggest that it existed.

Differences between Gudang and Urradhi
The main differences in phonology between Gudang and the Urradhi dialects appears to be:

Note that in ipadha 'father', Gudang p corresponds to Urradhi  (ivadha), both representing Proto-Paman *piipa, proto Gudang-Urradhi *piipata.

(2) Gudang had reflexive rt from Proto Paman *r and *rr

Proto-Paman *warapa 'water, stream', Urradhi atava, Gudang artaba

Proto-Paman *mara 'hand', Urradhi mata, Gudang arta

Proto-Paman *yurru 'elbow', Urradhi yutu (Angkamuthi yurtu), Gudang yurtu

Proto-Paman *murunya 'shin', Urradhi mutuny (Angkamuthi murtuny), Gudang urtunya

(3) A slightly higher rate of initial dropping (including initial syllables) was evident in Gudang.

(4) Gudang retained final CV syllables where Urradhi has reduced these to C.

(5) Gudang had word final -rra where Urradhi has -l, and stronger retention of rr and l in the clusters rrk and lk (e.g. see ukarra and ralkagamarra).

(6) Gudang had virtually no trace of the utterance final suppletion very evident in Urradhi (e.g. mata > matang, matak), the one exception being anhadhing.  However, initial and final vowel elision appeared to have been the norm.

(7) There was a strong tendency in Gudang for u to become i before following palatals (and perhaps elsewhere) (e.g. inyaanha, ikuurra).

The statistics of the comparisons are listed below.

These figures show that Gudang was a separate language from the Urradhi group.

Gudang and the Western-Central Language of Torres Strait (Kalau Lagau Ya)
Gudang shares about 20% of its words with Kalau Lagau Ya (termed WCL = Western-Central Language here-in) due to loaning between the languages.  It is obvious from MacGillivray, Brierly and Ray that there was extensive intermarriage and contacts between the Gudang and the Islanders, particularly but not exclusively with the people of the Muralag group (commonly called the Kowrareg people).  The data Brierly and others collected from Barbara Thompson and local people show that where marriage, clan membership and other cultural aspects were concerned, that the Gudang fitted as much into the Islanders' world as in the neighbouring Urradhi world.  Also, it appeared that the Gudang were on the whole bilingual in WCL, and this perhaps reflects the fact that so many WCL words were recorded as being Gudang by MacGillivray.  We will probably never know how many such recorded words were mistakes on his part, by him or his informants misunderstanding which language was being asked for.

Vocabulary comparison list
The following words are drawn from MacGillivray, J., 1852, "Narrative of the Voyage of HMS Rattlesnake", Vol II. London: T.W. Boone.., with some additions from MOORE, David R., 1979, "Islanders and Aborigines at Cape York : An ethnographic reconstruction based on the 1848-1850 'Rattlesnake' Journals of O.W. Brierly and information he obtained from Barbara Thompson". Canberra: Australian Institute of Aboriginal and Torres Strait Islander Studies.  The spelling has been standardised according the phonological outline above. MacGillivray has for example (quote):

In those cases where MacGillivray's and Brierly's written forms were too uncertain, the form in their spellings is in italics.

Cognates are bold, possible cognates italic, and loans/possible loans from WCL marked by *.

A very intriguing aspect of most of the verb forms noted by MacGillivray is that they are either reduplicated forms (such as amamangi, which corresponds to Urradhi ama), or are marked by -kamarra/-gamarra, which does not appear to have an Urradhi cognate.

G = Gudang, Y = Yadhaykenu, At = Atampaya, A = Angkamuthi, WCL = Western-Central Torres Strait Language, MM = Meriam Mìr; WCL dialects: KKY = Kalau Kawau Ya (northern dialect), KLY = Kalaw Lagaw Ya (western dialect), KY = Kaiwalgau Ya (Kowrareg - southwestern dialect), KulY = Kulkalgau Ya (eastern dialect [Central Islands dialect]), OKY = Old Kaiwalgau Ya (the Kowrareg of the mid-to-late 19th century).

G aachari, Y achawi, At achawi, A achawi, WCL — mushroom

G abiyangkangarra touch, Y aypa, At aypa, A aypa hold, touch, WCL nœidha- hold, touch

G achiinya, Y —, At ungkeeni, A achin, wuyunpa, WCL kakùr egg

(MacGillivray also noted achiina 'testes', which is evidently the same word as achiinya.)

G achunya, Y ukumanhthan, At ukumanhthan, A ukumanhthan, rupungunma, WCL bathainga tomorrow

G adhara, Y ayara, At ayara, A ayara, WCL kuki north-west wind/monsoon

G *aga, Y *agha, At atampanh, arru, A yanhi, WCL aga(thurik) axe

G agaayi, Y munya, At munya, ulkin, A —, WCL dhe, mòòs  saliva

G agura stringy bark, Y winhthi, At winhthi, A winhthi, uran paper-bark, WCL ubu tea-tree

G akaanya, Y adhal, At adhal, A adhaa, well, hole, WCL máy well, arkath hole, mœram dug well/hole, grave

G akelgarra, Y uyuru, At uyuru, A —, 'rub, grind', WCL almathama- grind, kurthuma- rub

G akumi, Y akumi, At akumi, A akumi dilly bag, WCL yana bag

G akuumpa, Y angkutumala, At itadhi, A anyanaghatha rush, WCL bayil

G alba, Y alva, At alva, A alva, WCL gùb wind

G alka, Y arka, At akwa, A arka, WCL kœlak spear

G alka, Y ulumu, At ulumu, anyaarra, A ulumu, WCL yabu(gùd) path

G ama, Y ama, At ama, A ama, WCL mabaig man, person

G amamangi get up, Y ama, At ama, G ama wake up, get up, fly, WCL danpalai- wake up, wœri- fly

G (*?)ampa, Y ani, cf Y ampimana clearing, At nani, A ani ground, soil, WCL bœradhar ground, soil, land, aap garden

G ampaanya throw into, Y ya, At watanga, A —, WCL thaya- throw

G ampu, Y ampu, At ngampu, A ampu, WCL dhang tooth

G anpa, Y anpangu, At anpangu, A anpangu, WCL alai husband

G anpaamu, Y ampaamu, At ampaamu, A ampaamu, WCL garkaz male

G anpunya, Y anpuny, At —, A —, WCL biuni kookaburra

G anpunya, Y iyamu, At uyamu, A iyamu, WCL kawa island

G ant[h]aar[r]a, Y yalan, punhu, At lalan, A yalan, WCL nœi tongue

G ant[h]i sore, Y iyirri, At iyirri, A iyirri 'sore, blister', WCL baadh sore, upu blister

G ant[h]iir[r]a, Y anchin, At wanycha, mutunmanhu, A anchin, WCL waam (KY uthua) honey

G antuuba,tuuba, Y antu(va) , At antu(va) , A antu(ba) , WCL KKY/KY  ngii, KLY/KulY nii you SG

G anhthu, Y anhthu, At atagha, A ?, WCL parma red ochre

G ant[h]uunt[h]unya, Y arru, At arru, A arru, WCL mathama-, wœrima-, palngi- hit,strike

G antyentyarra, Y watu, At watu, A watu, WCL thapa-, waya- row, paddle

G angka, Y angka, At  nhangka, A angka, WCK gud mouth

G  laugh. sharp, Y angkaarri, At angkaarri, A angkaarri, WCL giw laugh, gizul(ai)- sharp

G angka[a]nya, Y antu, At ghantu, A antu, WCL guul, thœthak canoe

G angkenka drink, Y ungye, At ungye, Aungya drink,eat, WCL puratha-(i)- eat, wani- drink

G angkibaanya, Y upudhingu, At upudhingu, A ?, WCL kuruwai rainbow

G angkuur[r]a, Y mupa, alguumala, udhayki, At mupa, akimpata, A mupa, WCL kaazi child

G anha, Y anha, At anha, A anha, WCL ngœna breath

G anhadhing, Y anhaayma, At anhiima, A anhaayma alive

G anycighalkamarra dance, Y anychirri, At anychirri, A anychirri corroboree song, WCL girel, sagul dance, na song

G apaanycha, Y adhal, At adhal, A adhaa, WCL arkath hole

G apiiga, Y amputhumuny, At apiigha, A amputhumuny, WCL kùpa Eugenia fruit

G apur[r]a, Y ipi, At ipi, A ipi, WCL aari rain

G apur[r]iiga, Y unychil, At alarrkudhi, A unychii, WCL kuwath brolga

G aruunyci, Y arunychi, At —, A —, WCL putit (?) yellow fruit

G artaba, Y atava, yati, At atava, yati, A atava, yati, WCL kœsa river, creek

G at[h]ed[h]arra eat, Y ungye, At ungye, A ungya drink,eat, WCL purtha- eat, wani- drink

G at[h]ir[r]a, Y apudha, At apudha, A apudha, ikyalitha (avoidance), WCL riidh bone

G at[h]iinya mother, Y ungunyu mother, At ungunyu mother, A ungunyu mother, breast, milk, WCL aapu mother, susu breast, (susu)ikai milk

G at[h]iir[r]ambaanya, Y umpwa, At ighanhang, A ighanhanga, WCL papalama-, patida-, etc. break

G arta, Y mata, At mata, A mata, WCL geth hand

G awuur[r]a, Y adhiny, At -, A adhiny, WCL wereg asi-/yœraagi asi- (dialect difference) hungry

G aygi, Y yiighin, At riighin, A yiighin, WCL buthu, surum sand, beach

G ayiir[r]i, Y uta, At uta, A uta, WCL bangal, thœuma bye and bye

G aykaana, Y akyaana, At akyan, akyaana, A akyan, WCL mœlpal, kisay moon

G aykunya, Y ichuny, athatha, warrki, At atava, warrki, A ichuny, warrki, WCL baba  quill

G aykuwa, Y *yutha, At awuchi (< house), akyun camp, A *yutha, awuchi (< house) hut, WCL yœuth long house, hall, church, mùdh shelter, calm place, house, hut, camp, laag place, house, home

G -, Y *yutha, At akicha house, church, A akicha house, church, WCL yœuth long house, hall, church

G aypiir[r]a, Y ana, At ana, anma, A ana go, come, WCL uzara-, laadhu- (plural stem), wœlmai-, tadi- (plural stem) go (+ bœi/ngapa to form come)

G aypunya, Y uyany, At uyany, A uyany green ant, WCL muzu stinging ant, green ant

G []yuba, Y ayu(va) , At ayu(va) , A ayu(va) , WCL ngai I
(MacGillivray also noted the form eipana (aipaana) as meaning I, me)

G aaku, Y aku, At aku, A aku tick, louse, WCL tikath tick, aari louse

G aaku we, Y/At/A ali we DU INC, ana we PL INC, ampu we EXC

G *baaga cheek, Y ula cheek, At wula cheek, jaw, A ula cheek, WCL mœsa cheek (cf. baag jaw, MM bag cheek)
 
G []biilkagarr, Y —, At wanhtha, A —, WCL pagama- sew

G *bubaatha grandfather, Y athi(dha) mother's father, wuula(dha) father’s father, At athi(dha) mother's father, wuula(n) father’s father, A athi(dha) mother's father, wuula(dha) father’s father, WCL bœbath grandparent, athe, KKY pópu grandad (paternal and maternal)

G *burruburru, Y —, At anychul, A anychuu, WCL kùnar ash(es), cf. WCL buru (saw)dust, chips, crumbs

G *burwa, *kwacherra, Y muyul, At muyul, A muyuu pandanus, WCL kausar inland pandanus, bœruwa young kausar

G *canha, Y *inpal, At *inpal, A *inpaa, WCL pel fish tail, cf. saan dugong tail

G *carima, Y mata, At mata, utama, A mata, WCL sayima (OKY sarima) outrigger

G *caaka lungs, Y yampa lungs, leaf, At yampa lungs, leaf, yamparra lungs, A yampa lungs, leaf, inparra lungs, WCL mòòs lung, niis leaf
(Ray (1907:122) recorded WCL suka (i.e. sœka) as lungs (of turtle and dugong)).

G *caamudaanha, Y —, At —, A angwaa-anyan, WCL dœnasam(u) eyelash (OKY also samudaana)

G *carra tern, Y *charra, ukaapati, At *iyarra, angkangka, A — seagull, WCL sara tern

G *cicalurru, Y atal, muri, At atal, A ataa, muri rope, WCL wœru/uru rope, sisaluru type of rope, cf. musi strand

G cuuka, cooka, Y/At/A *chughuva, WCL sœguba tobacco
(The Gudang forms are perhaps an early loan from Malay coki, otherwise is an abbreviated form of *cukuba)

G*daanha, Y anngal, At ipanh, A angwaa, WCL purka, daan eye

G []dhaama, Y inychantu, makyaana, At ilvan, A ilvan, WCL kœigœrsar many [lit. big number]; Cf Y udhima, At udhyama, A udhima, WCL ukasar two

G *dhumook, Y arramu, At aghumpa, A arramu, WCL dhumowak, dhœmuwak cloth, clothes

G echaar[r]a, Y anhthuny, At wipa, A anhthuny, WCL ini penis

G eguunt[h]i, Y —, At ayama, A ayama, WCL maadhu flesh

G ero:ra, Y-, At ithagha, A- flower, WCL kœusa fruit, flower

G etrara leaf, Y yampa leaf, flower, At yampa leaf, flower, A yampa leaf, flower, ithagha flower, WCL niis leaf

G ganhdha, Y —, At alghadha, A —, WCL kœrakar  fern

G *giiri, Y *ghiri, At *kiri, thawura, A *kiri, thawura, WCL *gii knife

G ichunya, Y lukuny, At uchuny, A lukuny, WCL kulka blood

G ikalkamarra, Y ikya, At ikya, A ikya, WCL (ya) mulai-/uuma- speak

G ikanpa cold or shiver, Y uchankama, At uvanhu, ukyanhthuny, A achanpa cold, WCL gabu cold, sumay shivering

G ikaar[r]a spear thrower, Y uchanpi, At uchanpi, A uchanpi spear thrower, club, WCL kùbai spear thrower, thuthu club

G ikuurra, Y urul, At ukyul, A unungkuu, WCL thuu smoke

G ikwuurra, Y akuny, At akuny, A akuny, WCL gœngaw skin

G ilaabayu, Y udhima, At makyaana, A udhyama, udhima, WCL ukasar two; cf. Y inychantu, At ilvan, A ilvan, WCL kœigœrsar (lit. big number) many

G imant[h]iinya warm, Y —, At umadhi, A — hot, WCL komal warm, hot

G imiir[r]i, Y anngal-athan, At ipanh-athan, A angwaa-athan eyebrow, WCL bœyib eyebrow, bœybasam eyebrow-hair

G impiibin[h]u come, approach, Y ana, At ana, anma, A ana, WCL uzarai-, ulai-/wœlmai- go, come

G impuuwa small, a bit, Y udhayki, At alvamu, A akimpata small, WCL mœgi(na), kœthuka small, little

G int[h]uunya large, Y aghatipu, At —, A aghatipu heavy, large, WCL kœi big, large, mapu heavy, kœigœrai large (in girth)

G int[h]uunya large, Y avukuny, At amanyma, A avukuny large, big, WCL kœi big, large, kœigœrai large (in girth)

G inga, Y wunga, At wunga, A wunga sun, WCL gœiga sun, day

G ingkud[h]iinya, Y utagha, At utagha, A utagha, WCL ùmai dog

G inyaaba, Y ula(va), At ula(va), A ula(va) they, WCL palai they DUAL, thana they PLURAL

G inyaanha another, Y unya, At unyinha, wanhu, A unyinha other, different, WCL war, wara other, wardh, warakidh different

(Note the formal resemblance between the two words inyaaba and inyaanha)

G ipadha, Y ivadha, At ivuny, A ivadha, WCL thathi father

G ipama kangaroo, Y ipamu, At ikamu, A - black kangaroo, WCL wœsar kangaroo, wallaby

G iipi, Y ipi, At ipi, A ipi, WCL ngùki fresh water

(MacGillivray had given creek bed as the meaning of WCL kœsa and Gud artaba.  Kœsa actually means creek, river, and artaba most likely meant the same.  For stream, he recorded : ipitaaba (ipi-artaba), which is actually water-creek.)

G ipiyaman[h]a, Y ipima, At nhipima, A ipima, WCL ùrapùn (wara+pùn) one

G ipunya, Y yapi, At yapi, A yapi, WCL pœuth forehead (see paadha)

G ir[r]iimad[h]in sleep, Y una, At una, A una sleep, lie down, WCL uthui sleep [noun] , uthui yu[na]i- lie down asleep

G irruurrunya, Y —, AT —, A uluyva, WCL lama- copulate

G ithiina thigh, Y ithiina thigh, At ithiina thigh, A ithin thigh, tree root, WCL madhu meat; thigh, sipi root

G it[h]uur[r]a, it[h]uulma, Y yuthu, At ruthu, A yuthu, WCL uma dead

G iwunya, Y iwuny, At ikuchi, A —, WCL kaura, kùrùsai- ear

G iya, Y amu, At nya, A inya, WCl waa yes

G *iibu, Y anya, At anya, A anya, WCL iibu chin

G iilpi, Y avidha, At lakun, A avidha, WCL akur guts

G iinta upper arm, Y winta, At winta, A winta arm, WCL zugu upper arm, kawai arm

G iingka, Y ina, At ina, A ina sit (down), WCL (apa)thanurai- sit (down), ni-/niya-/niina- sit, live, stay

G iipa heart, Y yipa, At lipa, A yipa liver, WCl siib(a) liver; seat of feelings; cf. Y antuun, At antudhi, A antuun heart, WCl ngœnakap heart [lit. breath-organ]

G iingku, Y wungku, At wungku, A wungku, WCL kulu knee, kuku leg joint

G iiyi, Y iyi, At umughanhu, A iyi nose, beak, WCL piti nose, buna beak

G *karaaba, Y wacharra, At angampa, A wacharra, WCL kab(a) (OKY kœraba) paddle

G *katamarra, Y *katamarra, At makyaarra, A *katamarra, WCL katham (plural kathamal) banana (fruit)

G *kartakarta  green frog (recorded as  kartakatta), Y *, aypara, At aypara, A aypara  frog, WCL kat(a) frog, underjaw part of jaw; neck (in compounds), Bœigu sub-dialect kœteko, kœteku frog

G *kayadha grandmother, Y ami(dha), At ami(n), A ami(dha) mother's mother; Y api(dha), At api(dha), A api(dha) father's mother; WCL kayadh grandmother

G *koona or *kuuna, Y wuntuny, At —, wurnrtuny, uyamuthu, WCL kùn(a) stern (kona/cona was recorded for OKY by Brierly and MacGillivray)
								
G []kuje blister, Y ukukanhthi blister, iyirri sore, blister, At iyirri sore, blister, A iyirri sore, blister, WCL baadh(a) sore, wound, uupu blister

G *kupara, Y ugharra, At ugharra, A ugharra, navel WCL (KLY/KulY/KY) kùpai, (KLY) kùpa, OKY kùpar birth cord, (KLY/KulY/KY) maithakùpai, (KLY) maithakùp, OKY maithakùpar navel maitha belly, stomasch); cf. kùp(a) bottom, base

G []kut[h]e, Y uyava, At atamudhi, athamudhi, A angkatha, WCl — native cat

G []langkunya crayfish, Y alangkuny, At dhalangkuny, A alangkuny crayfish, prawn, WCL kayar crayfish, kagui fresh water lobster, shrimp, prawn, KLY dhuuma shrimp, prawn

G *mabarr, Y —, At *mavarra, A — k.o. shell, WCL mabar(a) small mangrove conch with spikes

G *maakacha, Y *wacharra, At *acharra, *acharraki, A *wacharra mouse, WCL makas(a) mouse, rat;  wœsar(a) kangaroo, wallaby

G manu (recorded as nanu in MacGillivray ), Y manu, At manu, A manu, WCL kœkak, mabar(a) throat

G *marraapi, Y *marrapi, At *marrapi, A *marrapi, WCL mœrap(i), (KLY) mœraapi bamboo

G *merta, Y —, At intinti, A — fin, WCL met(a) dugong flipper

G *mudha, Y ilghul, At ukwal, A ilghuu shade, WCL mùdh(a) shelter, hut, back-yard, haven, place/spot protected from the wind, iradh(a) shade, shadow, ii dark shadow nder lee of island

G mur[r]ku gorged, Y wampan, At wampan, A wampan full, swollen, WCl (KKY) gùdapœlam full [lit. mouth-full, yœuru- / iiru- fill, swell, gorge

G *muungku, Y *mungka, At *mungka, A *mungka  (red) anthill, WCL muugu ant/termite hill/nest [generic term], white ant, termite

G muunha, Y akun, At inhen, A akun, WCL madh(a) vagina, cf MM moni vagina

G []naar[r]ama, Y —, At anpanychama, A —, WCL kùlkùb(a) long ago

G []net[h]aarri (this may have actually been  []net[h]aadhi, cf. anhadhing), Y —, At lipa, mupadhi, mupaayma, A — pregnant, WCL maithal(aig) have a belly; pregnant, mapu(ig/nga) heavy; pregnant (for the Atampaya form lipa see iipa; the stem of forms mupadhi and mupaayma (i.e. mupa) may be a loan from WCL)

G []niichalka, Y urrkul, At wughanhu, (avoidance language) anichaka, A urrkuu emu, WCL saamu cassowary, emu
                        
G []nuuba, Y alu, At alu, A alu that, there, WCL se-/si- that, there (the Gudang form appears to be a reflex of the Pama–Nyungan third person masculine pronoun *nyu-, found in WCL as nu-/-nu)

G *ngaaga, Y —, At wintuypuyumu (see iinta, thuugu), A —, WCL bœtha wing, ngaga bird/stingray wing

G *pada, Y yantal, At rantal, A yantaa, WCL paad(a) hill, tip, top, height (the Gudang word is presumably the same as the following, for which see)

G *paada, Y apun, At wapun, A apun, WCL kuik(u) head, paad(a) hill, tip, top, height (Proto-Paman *paanta top.  The retention of initial p in Gudang indicates that this is a WCL loan, as the expected form (through initial deletion or lenition and internal VVnC reduction, Crowley 1983:330-332) would be *ada/*aada or *wada/*waada, as has occurred in Gud ipadha from PP *pi:pa father)

G *puri, Y yuku, At yuku, A yuku  tree, WCL puy(i), OKY puuri tree, plant, post, pole, log; also WCL yuu  spit, skewer; see further yuuku

G ralkagamarra, Y yarka, At raka, A yarka, yaka jump, WCL katpalga-/-pœlagi- jump, skip, hop [lit. frog-jump/skip/hop], palga-/pœlagi- take off, fly away, jump, skip, hop

G ranga, Y akuny, At akuny, A akuny bark, WCL piya bark, skin, peel

G ringa (also found in ringkamarra sail (verb)), Y wili, At wili, A wili run, sail quickly, WCL pungai- sail, drive, zilmai-/zœlmai-/zilami- run, sail, aga-/agai- sail, drive, thardha- sail, drive, ride, wamayai-/wamaya-/wamayi- run away, sail away, guithwaya- leave, run away, sail away, depart, wanga- drive away, sail away

G rungkangkamarra, Y yungka, At rungka, A yungka cry, howl, WCL pœiba- make a noise, howl, cry

G ruulma, Y ipinyi, At ipinyi, A — swim, Y unma, At unma, A unma swim across, WCL pawœrpaga-, wœrpa paga-, wœrpaga-, pawœrulai-, wœrpu pudhai, wœrngupaga- swim, (wœrai) thapai-, (pawœr) waya-/wayai- swim along
 
G ruundar[r]a, Y awunpudha, At aghanapudha, A awunpudha, WCL daa, kaabu chest

G []tamparra, Y atampatha, At atamparra, A aghumu, WCL maa spider

G []tawiinya, Y atawuny, At uniina, A —, WCL paikaw, KLY pœtha, pœithaw butterfly

G *tetarr nail, Y *yathal nail, spider shell, At imunhthal nail, *yathaa nail, spider shell, WCL awar nail, talon, claw, tete animal/bird leg, cf. MM teter lower leg, upper foot, WCL (KLY,KulY,KY) yathai, (KLY) yatha, (OKY) yathar spider shell.

G tiida, Y tinta, At tinta, A tinta gun (Could this possibly be a loan from English tinder?), WCL gagay(i) bow(-and-arrow), gun

G *thawarr, Y ukuru, At —, A —, WCL kagar seaweed, thawal coast, shore, shoreline (the WCL word suggests a miscommunication between MacGillivray and his informant(s), mistaking seaweed for coast,  shore, shoreline.

G *theraapi, Y matapudha, At matapudha, A matapudha wrist, forearm, WCL thœyap(u) wrist, OKY thœrapu, (see also at[h]ir[r]a, ruundar[r]a, where  (a)pudha appears in other compounds in Urradhi – perhaps meaning body part [cf. the WCL word -kap(u) and the MM word -kep (of Papuan origin) of the same meaning found in many words to do with body parts].

G *thuugu, Y winta, At winta, A winta, WCL thuugu outrigger pole (The Urradhi word means arm – see iinta)

G ukwarra (ukarra), Y ukal, At nhukal, A ukaa foot, toe, WCL saan(a) foot, dhimur(a) finger, toe, siyar upper front part of foot; toes (considered by some to be an incorrect meaning), -kùk(u) ankle, foot, finger, toe, thumb (in compounds)

G ukwaagamarra (cf ukwarra), Y anpanyi, At anpanyi, A anpanyi  climb, WCL walai- climb, ascend, come/go up on a surface

G ulkiini, Y —, At ukirri, A —, WCL kùbak(i) cough

G uma, Y iwan, At iwan, A iwan mosquito, WCL iwi mosquito, kuwath(a) large, grey mosquito; Y uma, At uma, A uma, WCL mui fire

G umpiidha, Y umpidha, At umpidha, A umpidha, WCL iit(a) rock oyster, maay(i) sea oyster

G umpuipu white ghost/man, Y umany, At umany, A umany white ghost/man (umany is a specialised use of umany sweat), At wangachaghany white man, A wangukwal white man, ghost, WCL markai white ghost [spirit of a dead person that has gone to Kibukùth, the Other World – that is to say, the Land of the Dead over the western horizon, the pre-Christian heaven], European (and formerly Asian).

G umu, Y ukaluthu, At nhukalwuthu, A ukaauthu, WCL pokuk(u) heel

G unta wife, untamu female, Y untaamu, At untaamu, A untaamu wife, woman, WCL ipi wife, yipkaz (ipkaz, yœpkaz, KLY/KulY ipika, OKY ipikai) woman, girl, female

G unhthaanhtharra, Y —, At unhthe, A— shout at, call, WCL thara- shout, shout at, call, wal shout, call (noun) (The final two syllables of the Gudang word suggests that MacGillivray unknowingly also got the WCL word as well without realising it).

G upiinya hip; anus, Y wilu, At wilu, A wilu hip, WCL pasikap(u) hip [lit. side-body part]

G upiirra (MacGillivray) rotten, smelly, upiirri (Brierly) medecine, Y upirri, At upirri, A upirri sore, painful; witchcraft, WCL wœsai rot, stink, stench, rotten, smelly, puuy(i), OKY puuri (variant upœri) magic charm/gear/medecine (i.e. the material and language used in magic, but not the magic itself, which is maidh)

G ur[r]uwa, Y apunwuvu, At wapunwuvu, A apunwuvu, WCL thigi brain (see also *paada)

G utedangkarra cut, Y ute, At ute, A *ipaata cut, chop, WCL patha- cut, chop

G ut[h]iir[r]a, Y achal, At achal, A achaa, WCL ziya cloud

G uthiirra, Y u, At u, A u, WCL pœiba-, yœuda-/yœudha-, ma[ni]-, puypa-, sibawana- [lit. liver-put], KLY wiya- give; cf Y uthi, At uthi, A uthi give imperative

G urtu[u]nya leg, ankle [probably actually shin], Y mutuny, At mutuny, A murtuny, WCL thœra (archaic form thœrar) shin, ngaar(a) leg, danakuk(u) ankle

G uyimpa, Y ampu, At angkuula, umughanhu, A ampu, WCL buwai bow (of canoe)

G uuje, Y upangupa, At ampinhampi, A ampinhampi, WCL yal hair; soft (archaic meaning), yalkap(u) uncombed hair [-kap(u) body part], yalbùp(a) hair [bùp(a) grass], (gamu)magadh body hair [gamu body, magadh spear grass]

G uulpa, Y aypany, At aypanh, A aypany, WCL kùla stone

G uumpa, Y unhthuymumata, At *ripan, A unhthuymumata, WCL pœnipan(i) lightning

G uumpu, Y umpu, At wumpu, A umpu, WCL mimi urine

G uunpi, Y unpi, At unpi, A unpi, WCL thithuy(i) star

G uuna, Y ungi, At wuna, A ungi, WCL kùma dung

G uuntu upper back, Y wuntuny, At udhumpuny back(bone), A wurnrtuny backbone, stern, WCL lœpu upper back, thaburidh backbone [lit. snakebone], kùn(a) stern (MacGillivray also noted apa lower back, cf WCL apa- lower, below, down, underneath); see further wuuntu

G uunhtha, Y munhtha, At munhtha, A munhtha, WCL kùbi charcoal

G uupu tail, Y wupul, At wupul, A wupuu buttocks, tail, WCL kùp(a) bottom, base, dokap(u) rump, buttock, kœub(a) tail

G uurru, Y yupu, At lupu, A lupu boil, WCL tharthar boiling, tharthara-, tharthar thara- [stand] boil, zuiwœidha- [wœidha- place] boil (soup etc. ) (here the Gudang word may actually be the WCL word uur water)

G *wagel, Y *unhthuymu, At *unhthumu, A *unhthuymu, WCL (KLY/KulY/KY) *dhuyum(a), (KKY) gigi thunder; WCL wagel(a) after, behind (As thunder always follows lightning, wagel may have been recorded by MacGillivray through a misunderstanding).  The relationship between Urradhi unthuymu and WCL dhuyum(a) is unclear – if there is any.  A loan in either direction is possible, though the initial syllable in Urradhi might suggest that the word is a loan from WCL into Urradhi.  Compare the Yadhaikenu form angkapa hat, from English cap (see *walaapa).

G *waapadha, Y *wapadha, At *wapara, A *wapadha, WCL wapadha cotton tree

G *walaapa, Y angkapa, At *walapan, A *walapan, WCL walap(a), (KLY) gauga 'hat'

G wampa, Y uypuny, At uypuny, A uypuny fly N, WCL bùli house fly, paadig horse/marsh-fly, tœd/tœda bluebottle, (KLY) uripa fly sp.

G *wanawa, Y yakurru, At *wanawa, A — turtle shell, WCL kùnar(a) turtle shell (material for decoration), aagu top turtle shell, aath(a) bottom turtle shell, wœnawa shell turtle

G *warraaba, Y ungkuupun, At *warrava, A wuchungapun, WCL wœrab(a), wurab(a), urab(a) coconut (the Urradhi words contain the morpheme (w)apun head)

G *warrupa, Y *arupa, At *arupa, A *arupa  drum, WCL warup(a) hour-glass-shaped drum

G watay, Y —, At watay, A watii, WCL dhangal(a) dugong

G *waapi, Y —, At —, A inhanyii, WCL waapi fish

G *waarru, Y *iwurru, At yila k.o. turtle, A *waru, WCL  waaru turtle, green turtle

G *wurruy, Y inha, At minha, A inha  creature, WCL urui creature, bird

G wuuntu, Y aghal, ungkyal, At aghal, A aghaa, WCL thabai shoulder; see further uuntu

G *yetha, Y angkaiidha, At nhangkaiidha, A angkaiidha, WCL (KKY/KY/KLY) yatha, (KulY) yetha beard

G yulpalga, Y yupul, At manma, A — night, darkness, WCL kubil(a) night, iinur(a) dark(ness)

G yurtu, Y yutu, At yutu, A yurtu, WCL kudu elbow

G yuuku wood, Y yuku, At yuku, A yuku wood, tree, stick, log, WCL puy(i), OKY puuri tree, plant, post, pole, log; also WCL yuu  spit, skewer; see further puri
			
G []yuungu, Y unyungu, At unyungu, awucha, A unyungu breast, milk, WCL susu breast, udder, susuikai milk [ikai juice, sap]

Loans or Possible Loans from the Western-Central Language of Torres Strait (Kala Lagaw Ya)

The following words vary from clear to possible loans from WCL into Gudang and Urradhi.  This is shown by the phonology of the words (retention of consonant initials and other phonological 'oddities' from the point of view of Gudang and Urradhi).  Most are fairly recent,  however, some, such as sara 'tern', are older in that the Urradhi dialects have undergone sound changes similar to those undergone by Paman word stock.  Possible loans are marked (?).

WCL aap(a) garden :  G (?)ampa ground, soil, cf Y ampimana clearing

WCL aga(thurik) axe : G aga, Y agha

WCL apa- lower, below, down, underneath : G apa lower back

WCL baag(a) jaw : G baaga cheek

WCL bœbath(a) grandparent : G bubaatha grandfather

WCL buru (saw)dust, chips, crumbs : G burruburru ash(es)

WCL daan(a) eye : G daanha

WCL dhumowak(u), dhœmuwak(u) cloth, clothes : G dhumook

WCL (KLY/KulY/KY) dhuyum(a) thunder : Y unhthuymu, At unhthumu, A unhthuymu thunder (The relationship between Urradhi unthuymu and WCL dhuyum(a) is unclear – if there is any.  A loan in either direction is possible, though the initial syllable in Urradhi might suggest that the word is a loan from WCL into Urradhi.  Compare the Yadhaikenu word angkapa hat, from English cap).

WCL dœnasam(u) eyelash (OKY also samudaana) : G caamudaanha

WCL gii knife (OKY giri) : G giiri, Y ghiri, At kiri, A kiri

WCL iibu chin : G iibu

WCL kab(a) (OKY kœraba) paddle : G karaaba

WCL kat(a) frog, underjaw part of jaw; neck (in compounds), Bœigu sub-dialect kœteko, kœteku frog : G kartakarta  green frog (recorded as  kartakatta), Y 

WCL katham(a) (plural kathamal) banana (fruit) : G katamarra, Y katamarra, A katamarra

WCL kausar(a) inland pandanus, bœruwa young kausar : G burwa, kwacherra pandanus

WCL kayadh grandmother : G kayadha grandmother

WCL kùn(a) stern (kona/cona was recorded for OKY by Brierly and MacGillivray) : G koona or kuuna

WCL (KLY/KulY/KY) kùpai, (KLY) kùpa, OKY kùpar birth cord, (KLY/KulY/KY) maithakùpai, (KLY) maithakùp, OKY maithakùpar navel [maitha belly, stomach); cf. kùp(a) bottom, base : G kupara

WCL mabar(a) small mangrove conch with spikes : G mabarr, At mavarra k.o. shell

WCL makas(a) mouse, rat;  wœsar(a) kangaroo, wallaby : G maakacha, Y (?)wacharra, At (?)acharra, (?)acharraki, A (?)wacharra mouse

WCL met(a) dugong flipper, arm : G merta fin

WCL mœrap(i), (KLY) mœraapi bamboo : G marraapi, Y marrapi, At marrapi, A marrapi

WCL mùdh(a) shelter, hut, back-yard, haven, place/spot protected from the wind : G mudha

WCL muugu ant/termite hill/nest [generic term], white ant, termite : G muungku, Y mungka, At mungka, A mungka (red) anthill

WCL ngaga bird/stingray wing : G ngaaga wing

WCL paad(a) hill, tip, top, height : G pada hill, paada head

WCL patha- cut, chop : A ipaata cut, chop

WCL puuy(i), (OKY) puuri (variant upœri) magic charm/gear/medecine (i.e. the material and language used in magic, but not the magic itself, which is maidh) : G upiirri medecine, Y upirri, At upirri, A upirri sore, painful; witchcraft

WCL puuy(i), OKY puuri tree, plant, post, pole, log : G puri tree

WCL saan(a) dugong tail : G canha fish tail

WCL sara tern : G carra tern, Y charra, At iyarra seagull

WCL sayima (OKY sarima) outrigger : G carima

WCL sœguba tobacco : G cuuka, cooka, Y/At/A (The Gudang forms are perhaps an early loan from Malay coki, otherwise is an abbreviated form of an unrecorded cukuba)

WCL sœka lungs (of turtle and dugong)) : G caaka lungs

WCL tete animal/bird leg, cf. MM teter lower leg, upper foot : G tetarr finger/toe nail

WCl thawal coast, shore, shoreline : G thawarr seaweed (the WCL word suggests a miscommunication between MacGillivray and his informant(s), mistaking seaweed for coast,  shore, shoreline)

WCL thœyap(u) wrist, OKY thœrapu : G theraapi wrist, forearm

WCL thuugu outrigger pole : G thuugu

WCL uru / wœru rope, sisaluru type of rope : G cicalurru

WCL urui creature, bird : G wurruy creature

WCL uur / wur / wœr water : G (?) uurru boil

WCL waapi fish : G waapi

WCL  waaru turtle, green turtle : G waarru, Y iwurru, A waru

WCL wagel(a) after, behind : G wagel thunder (as thunder always follows lightning, wagel may have been recorded by MacGillivray through a misunderstanding)

WCL wapadha cotton tree : G waapadha, Y wapadha, At wapara, A wapadha

WCL walap(a) hat :  G walaapa, At walapan, A walapan

WCL warup(a) hour-glass-shaped drum : G warrupa, Y arupa, At arupa, A arupa  drum

WCL wœnawa shell turtle : G wanawa, At wanawa turtle shell

WCL wœrab(a), wurab(a), urab(a) coconut ; G warraaba, At warrava

WCL (KKY/KY/KLY) yatha, (KulY) yetha beard : G yetha

WCL (KLY,KulY,KY) yathai, (KLY) yatha, (OKY) yathar spider shell : Y yathal, A yathaa nail, spider shell

WCL yœuth(a) long house, hall, church : Y yutha, A yutha hut, house, church

External links 
 Bibliography of Gudang people and language resources, at the Australian Institute of Aboriginal and Torres Strait Islander Studies

References

 R.M.W. Dixon and Barry J. Blake (eds), 1983, Uradhi; in the Handbook of Australian Languages, VOL. 3:306-428. Canberra: The Australian National University Press.
 MacGILLIVRAY, J., 1852, Narrative of the Voyage of HMS Rattlesnake. London: T.W. Boone.
 Mitchell, Rod (1995). Linguistic Archaeology in Torres Strait: The Western-Central Torres Strait Language. Townsville: James Cook University (Masters Thesis).
 MOORE, David R., 1979, Islanders and Aborigines at Cape York : An ethnographic reconstruction based on the 1848-1850 'Rattlesnake' Journals of O.W. Brierly and information he obtained from Barbara Thompson. Canberra: Australian Institute of Aboriginal and Torres Strait Islander Studies.
 RAY, Sidney H., Linguistics, vol 3, Reports of the Cambridge Anthropological Expedition to Torres Straits. Cambridge, Cambridge University Press (Johnson Reprint Corporation, London, 1971)

Northern Paman languages
Extinct languages of Queensland